Jiří Zubrický (born 8 February 1964) is a Czech weightlifter. He competed for Czechoslovakia. He participated at the Olympic Games in 1988 and 1992. He won bronze medal at the 1990 World Weightlifting Championships behind, the two Soviets Leonid Taranenko and Artur Akoyev.  He was the heaviest competitors at the 1988 Summer Olympics with 164.95 kg (363 lb).

Major results

See also 
Czechoslovakia at the 1992 Summer Olympics
List of World Championships medalists in weightlifting (men)

References 

1964 births
Living people
Czech male weightlifters
Weightlifters at the 1988 Summer Olympics
Weightlifters at the 1992 Summer Olympics
Olympic weightlifters of Czechoslovakia
European Weightlifting Championships medalists
World Weightlifting Championships medalists